FC Gloria Buzău, commonly known as Gloria Buzău, is a Romanian association football club based in Buzău. The club currently plays in the Liga II.

History

Establishment
FC Gloria Buzău was founded on 16 June 1973, by the Buzău County Local Council, as part of CSM Buzău (Clubul Sportiv Municipal) (En: Municipal Sports Club), the local all-sports association.

Gloria absorbed the former team of Buzău, Metalul, whose place it also took in Divizia C (currently Liga III). With Metalul's players, together with other local footballers (especially from another team, Şoimii), they ranked 1st in their first season of Divizia C. Gloria won the subsequent Divizia B promotion play-off tournament and thus won promotion in their first year of existence.

1970s and 1980s
After several attempts to attack the first place in Seria I of Divizia B, Gloria managed, only 6 years after their establishment, to rank first at the end of the 1977–78 season and to gain promotion to the Divizia A for the first time for a team from Buzău. After a season in which Gloria obtained probably their best result in history (4–1 at home with Steaua București), they managed to surprisingly maintain themselves in the first league after causing a major upset by winning against UTA Arad, one of the Romanian giants of the moment, and provoking their relegation. They relegated though the next season.

After four seasons, Gloria was again in Divizia A where they remained for three more seasons. The season of 1984–85 was Gloria's most successful one in history as they ranked 5th and obtained their tickets to the Balkans Cup, where they reached the semi-finals stage, outpassed by Panionios of Greece.

Two decades of lower leagues
What followed was 20 seasons of anonymous lower-league football, including two seasons in Divizia C (2000–01 and 2001–02). After gaining promotion to the Divizia B again, former glory Viorel Ion took over as head coach and as player and led them to the Divizia A promotion play-offs lost in front of FC Politehnica AEK Timişoara.

Meanwhile, the club confronted itself with major financial difficulties, nearing bankruptcy. This went on up until the 2006–07 season, when investor Aurel Brebeanu took over the club from former president Dan Tulpan and managed to save the club. The same season also meant a big success for the Crâng-based club, as it won promotion to the Liga I after 20 years of absence.

In 2007, businessman Constantin Bucur purchased 52% of the shares of the newly promoted club, becoming majority shareholder.

Presence in the First League (2007–2009)
After the 2006–07 season, Gloria managed to promote to Liga I, coached by Viorel Ion. Businessman Constantin Bucur fired Ion after only a few matches in the 2007–08 season of Liga I, and replaced him with Ștefan Stoica. The team fought to avoid relegation to the last match, and managed to obtain the last rank that kept the team in the first league. The following season was more of a disappointment and Gloria finished last and relegated back to Liga II.

Back in the lower leagues

Abandoned by Bucur, and due to financial problems the team lost almost all the players at the end of the season 2008–09. The first season back in Liga II was difficult, as the team received an 8 pct deduction because it did not fulfill the minimum number of points in the previous season, and also lost the game from the first day with 3–0 by federal decision because it had some ex-players that were unpaid. They managed to find players only a few weeks before the start of the season. The board promoted Nicolae Anton as coach who had previously coached the second team (from the Liga IV) and the youth department. Although the team faced several problems it managed to get a run of 6 wins between days 2 and 8 (four of these wins came between days 2 and 5). The team avoided relegation by ranking 14th; after a new season in which they finished 10th, further financial problems caused the team to revert to youth players, which led to the relegation to the Liga III.

The 2012–13 season saw the team fighting to get back to Liga II. Their main opponents, Viitorul Axintele, seemed to have the better of them at the beginning, but after Ștefan Stoica (who came back to the team for the season) had to quit in order to care for his wife and was replaced with Marian Roșu, Gloria started to make up for the difference. In the direct match in the spring of 2013, Gloria lost to Viitorul and the promotion seemed to be lost. At the end of the season, however, a Romanian Football Federation inquiry proved that Viitorul did not have three youth teams in the county-level competition, as required by Liga III regulations, and gave Viitorul a 9-point penalty that led to Gloria finishing first and being promoted to Liga II.

On 26 May 2016, the Romanian Football Federation fined 14 Gloria players and three managers for match-fixing in Liga II in 10 matches between September 2014 and May 2015 and imposed total bans of 174 months on them. At the end of the 2015–16 Liga II season, Gloria had to face Olimpia Satu Mare in a relegation play-off in June but the club did not compete after it did not have enough players to line up once the bans had come into effect. Along with these developments the club went into bankruptcy.

Refounding and ascent (2016–present)
After the bankruptcy of FC Gloria Buzău, businessman Ionel Turturică founded a new club, FC Buzău, which was enrolled in the Liga V – Buzău County. After only one season, the new club, which also had players with many matches played for FC Gloria Buzău, promoted to Liga IV with a total of 63 points, 7 points ahead the second place.

In the summer of 2017 FC Buzău was renamed as SCM Gloria Buzău, as part of the city new sports club SCM Gloria Buzău, and at the end of the 2017–18 season promoted again, this time in the Liga III.

In the 2018–19 season of Liga III SCM Gloria managed to promote for the third consecutive year, this time in the Liga II, after winning the first series of the third tier, series in which they had tough matches against teams such as Oțelul Galați, Foresta Suceava, Bucovina Rădăuți or Ceahlăul Piatra Neamț, under these conditions "the red and blues" suffered their first defeat only in the last round, having the best run of all the series winners.

After two seasons in the Liga II ended with middle table rankings, SCM Gloria Buzău was renamed again as FC Buzău, in order to get a Liga I licence, provided that SCM Gloria was a public entity, but FC Buzău is a public-private partnership, a partnership that is legally eligible for a top-flight licence.

In the summer of 2022, the club regained its brand and was renamed FC Gloria Buzău, instead without associating with the old emblem and the old palmares.

Ground

The club plays its home matches on Municipal Stadium from Buzău, with a capacity of 12,000 seats. Municipal Stadium was opened in 1942, is located in the Crâng park, hence the nickname Crâng (Grove). The arena was renovated several times since its opening ceremony (1971–1976, 2005–2007, 2008). The last renovations works were made in the summer of 2018 when the pitch of the stadium was changed.

Support
Gloria Buzău has many supporters in Buzău and especially in Buzău County. The ultras group of Gloria it is known as "Peluza Crâng".

Honours

Domestic

Leagues
Liga I
Best finish 5th: 1984–85
Liga II
Winners (2): 1977–78, 1983–84
Runners-up (7): 1973–74, 1976–77, 1982–83, 1989–90, 1990–91, 2002–03, 2006–07
Liga III
Winners (3): 1971–72, 2001–02, 2012–13, 2018–19
Runners-up (1): 2000–01
Liga IV – Buzău County
Winners (1): 2017–18
Liga V – Buzău County
Winners (1): 2016–17

Players

First-team squad

Club officials

Board of directors

Current technical staff

League history

References

External links
 
 

Football clubs in Buzău County
Sport in Buzău
Association football clubs established in 1973
Liga I clubs
Liga II clubs
Liga III clubs
Liga IV clubs
1973 establishments in Romania